Ahammad Ali was a Bangladeshi  politician from Meherpur belonging to Bangladesh Nationalist Party. He was elected three times as a member of the Jatiya Sangsad. His son Masud Arun is a former member of the Jatiya Sangsad.

Biography
Ali was elected as a member of the Jatiya Sangsad from Kushtia-1 in 1979. Later, he was elected from Meherpur-1 in the Sixth Jatiya Sangsad Election. He was also elected from this constituency in the Seventh Jatiya Sangsad Election.

Ali died in 1999.

References

1999 deaths
People from Meherpur District
Bangladesh Nationalist Party politicians
2nd Jatiya Sangsad members
6th Jatiya Sangsad members
7th Jatiya Sangsad members
1935 births